John David Chabot (born May 18, 1962) is a Canadian former professional ice hockey player and coach. He played in the National Hockey League (NHL) from 1983 to 1991, and then played in Europe from 1991 until retiring in 2001. He later worked as a coach in the Quebec Major Junior Hockey League and spent two seasons as an assistant coach in the NHL in the 2000s.

Playing career
As a youth, Chabot played in the 1975 Quebec International Pee-Wee Hockey Tournament with a minor ice hockey team from Gatineau.

Chabot was Hull's first-round pick (first overall) in the 1979 QMJHL draft, and won the QMJHL Briere Trophy (MVP) and CCM QMJHL Player of Year in 1981–82 with Sherbrooke. He was drafted in 1980 by the Montreal Canadiens, and played 508 career National Hockey League games for the Montreal Canadiens, Pittsburgh Penguins and Detroit Red Wings. In his rookie year for the Canadiens he scored 18 goals and had a total of 43 points.

Chabot signed with HC Milan in 1991 and in 1992, he took his game to Germany and would play nine years in the country's top-flight league, the Deutsche Eishockey Liga. He first joined Preussen Berlin (changed name to Berlin Capitals in 1996), then had a three-year stint with the Frankfurt Lions and played for Eisbären Berlin in his last season as a professional athlete (2000–01).

Coaching career
Chabot's junior coaching career includes the QMJHL's Hull Olympiques, Gatineau Olympiques and Acadie-Bathurst Titan. In his four years of coaching the Gatineau Olympiques he made two appearances in the Memorial Cup. He also spent one year as an assistant coach for the New York Islanders of the NHL.

Personal life
Chabot attended high school at D'Arcy McGee in Hull, Quebec. John Frobel was one of many childhood friends. He is Algonquin from Kitigan Zibi, and is active in visiting reserves to speak and run hockey skills camps across Canada. When he was visiting students in the Matawa Learning Center he told students that hockey kept him out of trouble as a young boy. He also stated that "It's a place to go with your friends that is healthy and it gives the opportunity to feel better about yourself and if you feel better about yourself you make better choices". Chabot is also the president of Anishinabeg Communications, a company that specializes in promotional items, printing, graphic design, and brand development.

Career statistics

Regular season and playoffs

References

External links
 

1962 births
Living people
Acadie–Bathurst Titan coaches
Adirondack Red Wings players
Berlin Capitals players
BSC Preussen Berlin players
Canadian expatriate ice hockey players in Germany
Canadian ice hockey centres
Canadian ice hockey coaches
Detroit Red Wings players
Eisbären Berlin players
First Nations sportspeople
Frankfurt Lions players
Gatineau Olympiques coaches
Hull Olympiques coaches
Hull Olympiques players
Ice hockey people from Prince Edward Island
Montreal Canadiens draft picks
Montreal Canadiens players
New York Islanders coaches
Nova Scotia Voyageurs players
Ojibwe people
People from Summerside, Prince Edward Island
Pittsburgh Penguins players
Sherbrooke Castors players
EV Zug players